Veniliornis is a genus of birds in the woodpecker family Picidae. They are native to Central and South America.

Taxonomy
The genus was introduced by the French ornithologist Charles Lucien Bonaparte in 1854. The word Veniliornis combines the name of the Roman deity Venilia with the Greek word ornis meaning "bird". The type species was designated as the blood-colored woodpecker (Veniliornis sanguineus) by the English zoologist George Robert Gray in 1855.

The genus contains the following 14 species:

References

 
Bird genera

Taxa named by Charles Lucien Bonaparte
Higher-level bird taxa restricted to the Neotropics
Taxonomy articles created by Polbot